"Autostop" ("Hitch-Hiking") was the  entry in the Eurovision Song Contest 1980, performed in Greek by Anna Vissi and the Epikouri.

With music by Jick Nacassian and lyrics by Rony Sofu, "Autostop" was Greece's sixth entry in the contest. It is an up-tempo number about the tradition of hitch-hiking throughout Europe. Vissi suggests that it is the best way of seeing the world and sings that one can even go as far as China. The song is also memorable for the frequent repetition of the title, with the word being sung 37 times. Also of note is the fact that Lia Vissi, Vissi's older sister, made an appearance as one of the backing singers, having done the same one year before. Both sisters would go on (at the 1982 contest in Anna's case and the 1985 contest in Lia's) to represent their country of birth, .

The Eurovision Song Contest 1980 took place in The Hague, Netherlands on April 19, 1980. "Autostop" was performed third out of the nineteen entries of the night and followed 's Ajda Pekkan with "Pet'r Oil" while preceding 's Sophie & Magaly with "Papa Pingouin". At the close of voting, the performance had received 30 points, placing 13th in a field of 19.

It was succeeded as Greek representative at the 1981 contest by Yiannis Dimitras with "Feggari Kalokerino".

See also
Greece in the Eurovision Song Contest 1980

References

Eurovision songs of Greece
Eurovision songs of 1980
Greek-language songs
Anna Vissi songs
1980 songs